Kevin Robert Darling is a former New Zealand international lawn bowler.

Profile
He was born in Dunedin, New Zealand on 14 February 1947.

Bowls career
He won a bronze medal in the pairs and a bronze medal in the fours at the 1980 World Outdoor Bowls Championship in Melbourne.

Ten years later he won a bronze medal at the 1990 Commonwealth Games in the fours with Peter Shaw, Phil Skoglund and Stewart McConnell.

He won the 1988 singles title and the 1973 & 1974 pairs titles at the New Zealand National Bowls Championships when bowling for the Balmacewen & Caversham Bowls Clubs.

In 1990, Darling was awarded the New Zealand 1990 Commemoration Medal.

References

Living people
New Zealand male bowls players
1950 births
Commonwealth Games medallists in lawn bowls
Commonwealth Games bronze medallists for New Zealand
Bowls players at the 1990 Commonwealth Games
20th-century New Zealand people
21st-century New Zealand people
Medallists at the 1990 Commonwealth Games